Juan Bautista Alberdi (Tucumán) is a settlement in Tucumán Province in northern Argentina.

Notable people 

 Joaquín Correa

Populated places in Tucumán Province